Choqa Bala or Choqa-ye Bala may refer to:
 Choqa Bala-ye Olya
 Choqa Bala-ye Sofla